This list contains people associated with the College of Charleston in Charleston, South Carolina, including current and former college presidents, as well as notable alumni and faculty members.

Alumni

Actors
 Erick Avari - actor ( The Mummy, Daredevil, Mr. Deeds and  Heroes)
 Matt Czuchry, class of 1999 - actor (Gilmore Girls, The Good Wife and The Resident)
 Jennifer Ferrin - actor (nominated for a Daytime Emmy in 2005 and 2006 for As the World Turns; also known for work on Sex and the City 2, The Following, and Hell on Wheels)
 Thomas Gibson - actor (Far and Away, Dharma and Greg [for which he was twice nominated for a Golden Globe Award], Chicago Hope, and Criminal Minds)
 Orlando Jones - actor (MADtv, The Replacements, Magnolia, Evolution, and Sleepy Hollow)
 Allison Munn, class of 1997 - actor (What I Like About You, That '70s Show, and One Tree Hill)

Artists and architects
 Christopher Boffoli, class of 1993 - fine art photographer
 Ben Hollingsworth, class of 2004 - former professional soccer player, abstract artist and sculptor
 Samuel Lapham VI, class of 1913 - architect with the firm Simons & Lapham (1920–1972), which designed the west wing of Randolph Hall/Chemistry Wing (1930), the Student Activities Building (1939), Craig Dormitory and Cafeteria (1962), Robert Smalls Library (1972) and Cougar Mall
 Francis D. Lee, class of 1846 - architect and inventor; several of his buildings are on the National Register for Historic Places
 Robert Mills (1781–1855) - studied at the College in the late 18th century; first American-born man to be professionally trained as an architect; designed the Washington Monument, Department of Treasury building, and U.S. Patent Office Building
 Brian Rutenberg, class of 1987 - abstract painter

Athletes
 Jarrell Brantley - professional basketball player for the Utah Jazz
 Joe Chealey - professional basketball player for the Charlotte Hornets
 Dontaye Draper - professional basketball player, named Europcup MVP in 2011
 Brett Gardner, class of 2005 - professional baseball player for the New York Yankees
 Andrew Goudelock - professional basketball player for Maccabi Tel Aviv of the Israeli Premier League and the Euroleague; drafted by the Los Angeles Lakers, 2014 Eurocup MVP
 Heath Hembree - professional baseball player; played for the San Francisco Giants and the Boston Red Sox
 Anthony Johnson, class of 1997 - professional basketball player; first player in College of Charleston history selected in the NBA Draft; spent 14 seasons (1997–2010) in the NBA and played for seven teams
 Wes Knight - professional soccer player for the FC Edmonton
 Michael Kohn - professional baseball player for the Los Angeles Angels
 Andrew Lawrence, class of 2013 - professional basketball player, played for Great Britain Olympic Team in 2012

Musicians
 Cary Ann Hearst, class of 2001 - vocals, guitar, drums, keyboard, and percussion with Shovels & Rope; her song "Hell's Bells" was featured on HBO's True Blood; at 2013 Americana Music Honors & Awards, Shovels & Rope received awards of Emerging Artist of the Year and Song of the Year for their song "Birmingham"
 Edwin McCain - Pop singer-songwriter

Politicians and public servants
 Mendel Davis, class of 1966 - Democrat, United States House of Representatives representing the First Congressional District of South Carolina (1971–1981)
 James B. Edwards, class of 1950 - oral surgeon; former Governor of South Carolina; Secretary of Energy under President Ronald Reagan; president of the Medical University of South Carolina
 John Charles Frémont, class of 1836 - "the Great Pathfinder;" explored the West in the 1830s and 1840s;an outspoken opponent of slavery; in 1856 the first Republican nominee for president; major general for the Union during the Civil War; in 1861, issued a proclamation (overturned by President Lincoln) freeing slaves; later governor of Arizona
 John Geddes, class of 1795 - 22nd governor of South Carolina (1818-1820)
 Burnet R. Maybank, class of 1919 - Mayor of Charleston; 99th governor of South Carolina; US Senator for South Carolina 1941-1954; chaired the Senate Finance Committee; played a key role in the development of the New Deal; namesake of Maybank Hall, one of the main academic buildings on campus
 Glenn McConnell, class of 1969 - attorney; an influential force in South Carolina politics for more than two decades; elected to public office in 1981; president pro tempore of the South Carolina Senate from 2001 until he replaced the disgraced Ken Ard as the state's Lieutenant Governor; namesake of McConnell Residence Hall dormitory was named after him; president of the College of Charleston 2014-2018
 Arthur Ravenel, class of 1950 - real estate developer; member of the South Carolina House of Representatives, South Carolina senator (1980-1986); elected to the U.S. House of Representatives in 1986; returned to the South Carolina Senate in 1996, serving until 2005; elected to the Charleston School Board in 2006, at age 79; namesake of the bridge connecting Charleston to Mt. Pleasant
 Joseph O. Rogers, Jr. - transferred to The Citadel, Democratic member of the South Carolina House of Representatives (1955-1966); 1966 Republican nominee for governor of South Carolina; U.S. attorney 1969-1970; practicing attorney in Manning
 Nick Shalosky, class of 2010 - first openly gay elected official in South Carolina; serves downtown Charleston on the District 20 Constituent School Board
 Casey DeSantis, class of 2003 - News reporter and First Lady of Florida
 Julius Waties Waring, class of 1900 - U.S. federal judge who played an important role in the early legal battles of the American Civil Rights Movement
 Madeleine Westerhout, class of 2013 - former Personal Secretary to the President and Director of Oval Office Operations for the Trump Administration
Cheryll Novak Woods-Flowers, class of 1981-First female Mayor Town of Mount Pleasant, SC...1992-2001

Writers
 Paul Hamilton Hayne, class of 1852 - poet, critic and editor
 Ludwig Lewisohn, class of 1901 - novelist, translator and literary and drama critic; founding professor of Brandeis University
 Padgett Powell, class of 1974 - writer and novelist
 Ron Cooper, class of 1982 - novelist, poet, and essayist
 Dan Beckmann, - Emmy Award winning NBC News Journalist, Writer, Producer, Editor in Tel Aviv and Jerusalem Bureaus.  Author and Contributing Columnist for Tribune Publishing; Orlando Sentinel, Chicago Tribune, New York Daily News, The Baltimore Sun 
 Louis D. Rubin, Jr. - literary scholar and critic, writing teacher, publisher, and writer
 Catherine Mann, class of 1985 - USA Today bestselling novelist, winner of the RITA Award, novels translated/released in more than twenty countries

Others
 Frank Blair (1915–1995), class of 1934 - early cast member of NBC's The Today Show, newsman and anchor, 1953-1975
 George B. Rabb, class of 1951 - American zoologist, president emeritus of the Chicago Zoological Society and former director of the Brookfield Zoo in Chicago
 Buist M. Fanning, class of 1970 - translator of the 1995 update to the New American Standard Bible
 Arlinda Locklear, class of 1973 - lawyer, known for being the first Native American woman to argue a case before the U.S. Supreme Court
 Millicent Brown, class of 1975 - civil rights activist
 Harriet McBryde Johnson, M.P.A., 1981 - author, attorney, and disability rights activist
 Jackie Sumell, class of 1996 - artist and social activist for ending solitary confinement in the U.S. prison system
 Carol Hannah Whitfield, class of 2007 - fashion designer; finalist on the sixth season of Project Runway
 Jerry Mancini, class of 1998 - Long Island Commercial Real Estate broker, known as "The NNN King"  Nafees Bin Zafar, class of 1998 - recipient of two Academy Awards for special effects (2007 and 2015), Principal Engineer at DreamWorks Animation (Pirates of the Caribbean: At World's End, Shrek Forever After, Kung Fu Panda 2'')

Current
Bret Lott - Professor of English, best-selling writer
Evan Parry - Associate Professor of Theatre, A member of the Actor's Equity Association and the Screen Actor's Guild and continues to work as a professional actor, director and fight director in a ongoing effort to satisfy his primary performance interests of classical and physical theatre. He serves as co-director of The Shakespeare Project. He previously served on the faculties of Michigan State University and SUNY/Buffalo.

Former
Alison Piepmeier - Professor of Women's and Gender Studies, known for her zine scholarship

References

 
College of Charleston People